Pinacocerus is a genus of flies in the family Dolichopodidae, known from Chile and Argentina.

Species
 Pinacocerus candiptorum Bickel, 2012
 Pinacocerus nodicornis Van Duzee, 1930

References

Dolichopodidae genera
Sympycninae
Diptera of South America